Angela Mudge (born 8 July 1970) is a Scottish champion hill runner and skyrunner. Despite being born with birth defects in both legs, and finding track athletics not to her liking, she discovered her sport while a postgraduate student in Scotland in the mid-1990s, and developed rapidly.

She has won the Scottish Hill Running Championships three times (1997, 1998, 2006), the British Fell Running Championships five times (1997–2000, 2008), and holds the women's record on more than thirteen courses in Scotland alone. On the international stage she won the Women's World Mountain Running Trophy in 2000, the World Masters Mountain Running Championships in 2005, and the Buff Skyrunner World Series in 2006 and 2007. She was named on a list of "100 things we still love about sport" by The Observer newspaper in June 2008.

Early years
Mudge's start in life did not augur well for a future in endurance running, after she was born with pedal defects; both of Angela's feet and one of her twin sister Janice's were pointing backwards. She has commented that "[w]e got a bit squashed in the womb", and for the first few years of their lives both girls were required to have their legs in braces and plaster to rectify this.

When she was a teenager she raced on the track, but gave it up out of dissatisfaction with "running in circles". Even cross-country courses were insufficiently challenging, and it was only following her graduation from the University of Leicester with a BSc in chemistry, when she moved north to the University of Stirling to obtain her master's degree, that she discovered hill running and began to fulfil her potential. When she subsequently moved to the University of Edinburgh to study for her PhD, she joined the Carnethy Hill Running Club, where she remains an active member and competitor. She obtained her doctorate in 2000.

Although born and raised in Devon, Mudge has only ever represented Scotland at international level, commenting that "[i]t would've been tough to have gone back down south and tried to gain selection there. Once I started running for Scotland there seemed no point in changing because they gave me my opportunity."

National and international career
Mudge came late to hill running by comparison with more mainstream athletics competitors, not recording results until her mid-twenties, but developed quickly thereafter. Placed only 49th in the British Fell Running Championship in 1995, she won the event four times in succession from 1997–2000. In between times, she scored a fourth-place finish in the 1997 European Mountain Running Trophy, and also won the Scottish Hill Running Championships in 1997 and 1998, and the Scottish Cross Country Championship in 1999. She showed equally rapid development on the international stage, placing 46th in the 11th World Mountain Running Trophy when it was held in Scotland in 1995, five years prior to winning the event outright in 2000.

She continued her international success in 1999, the year she broke the course record for the prestigious  Mount Kinabalu Climbathon in Sabah, Malaysia, as she won the race and the US$2,500 prize. Mudge also triumphed in similar record-breaking style in the 2001 Cinq 4,000s in Sierre-Zinal, Switzerland, becoming the first woman to achieve a sub-three-hour time on the  course.

In the European Mountain Running Trophy, her best results have been as runner up in Bad Kleinkirchheim, Carinthia, Austria in 1999, which she repeated in 2001 in Slovenia, finishing behind Russian Svetlana Demidenko, and again in 2003 in Trento, Italy, when Belgium's Catherine Lallemand won. She won the women's World Mountain Running Trophy in Bergen, Germany against expectations in 2000; as with all even-numbered years, the Trophy race followed the international style, which typically only involves an ascent. Mudge is more experienced in British fell-running, which includes running up and down hills, but found success despite being unable to exploit her greater descending experience. Mudge herself described the WMRT win as "the pinnacle of my career" in a June 2008 interview.

Following her World Mountain Running Trophy win, she was one of only five Britons nominated at the 2001 Laureus World Sports Awards, alongside footballer David Beckham, rower Steve Redgrave, triple jumper Jonathan Edwards and boxer Lennox Lewis. However, she was unable to attend the ceremony at the Royal Albert Hall in London because she had already booked a long-planned holiday to the Antipodes and, she claimed, "...didn't possess a little black dress, and would only have wandered around collecting autographs."

She finished second behind New Zealand's Melissa Moon in the 2003 World Mountain Running Trophy, held in Girdwood, Alaska. Compatriots Tracey Brindley finished third and Lyn Wilson eighteenth, and these combined results meant Scotland won the Women's Team championship. She also won the 2003 Pikes Peak Marathon, which she only entered as a warm up for the Alaska race. Her victory in 4h 19m 38s not only set an age-group record for the  peak, it marked the only defeat in six years for Los Alamos, New Mexico runner Erica Larson, the most successful woman in the event's history.

2005 injuries
Mudge missed much of the 2005 season, first recuperating from an operation to rehabilitate a damaged knee which left her on crutches, and then succumbing to a bout of plantar fasciitis between May and July. Of her surgery, Mudge said: "I'd worn away all my knee cartilage – more to do with my running style than the sport itself. I was running on the bare bone of my femur, so the surgeon drilled a lot of holes, which stimulates scar tissue, and eventually, I could run again. My knee was more painful afterwards than before. I was prepared for that, but was allowed to run for only ten minutes even months after the operation. I deliberately did not ask about the success or failure rate in order to keep a positive frame of mind. It was only six months later that a physiotherapist told me there were lots of people for whom the operation did not work."

On her return from injury, she won three races in Switzerland and placed second in their National Championship. Her prizes included a large raclette cheese and a CHF50 voucher for a local florist. She had to decline the latter, as she had no place for a vase of flowers—she lives in a tent when touring the circuit, cooking over a gas stove and travelling to events by bicycle.

Although she missed most of the summer, she recovered sufficiently to win the fifth World Masters Mountain Running Championships in England's Lake District in September.

Skyrunning

For 2006 Mudge became a member of the Team SaabSalomon Adventure Running Team, and competed in the Buff Skyrunner World Series, a grand prix of eight high altitude endurance races around the globe. She did not participate in the opening race in Hidalgo, Mexico, but was victorious in four successive subsequent rounds in Zegama, Spain, Valposchiavo, Switzerland, Nagano, Japan, and Canazei, the Dolomites, Italy, breaking the course record on each occasion. She missed two subsequent events following the loss of her twin sister to cancer, but her third place in the 20th Mount Kinabalu Climbathon in Malaysia in the final event of the season ensured she won the Series overall, along with the €3000 prize. She also regained her Scottish Hill Running Championship title in 2006, winning all four of the events she entered.

Team SaabSalomon retained Mudge's services for the 2007 Skyrunner Series, and she subsequently won the first three races in which she competed, in Berga, Berguedà, in the Catalan region of Spain, Vallnord in Andorra, and the Dolomites in Italy. A second-place finish in the Zegama-Aizkorri Alpine Marathon was enough to see her retain her title in 2007.

She finished eighth overall, the first woman and the second westerner out of 80 participants, setting a course record of 5h 3m, thirteen minutes ahead of the previous mark.

She was an occasional competitor in the 2008 series, winning in Valposchiavo, Switzerland, and her home event in Fort William, Scotland. She also finished second in the other two races she entered, the WMRA Grand Prix in Saillon-Ovronaz, Switzerland, and the Sky Marathon de la Grigne in Italy. However, a record-breaking performance by rival Corinne Favre in the latter denied Mudge a third successive championship.

In domestic competition, she became the British Fell Running Champion for the fifth time in 2008, after winning all four races in which she competed.

Selected results

World Cup wins

References

External links
Personal website of Angela Mudge
Interview with Angela Mudge, Carnethy Running Club website
List of Scottish medallists, at Scottish Athletics website

Living people
1970 births
Sportspeople from Tavistock
British fell runners
British female mountain runners
British female long-distance runners
Scottish female long-distance runners
Alumni of the University of Edinburgh
Alumni of the University of Stirling
Alumni of the University of Leicester
British sky runners
Female ultramarathon runners
Trail runners
World Mountain Running Championships winners